Samuel Bridgman Russell (9 August 1864 – 2 August 1955) was a Scottish architect who became chief architect to the Ministry of Health and after the Tudor Walters Report and the Addison Act 1919 designed to a series of model houses, which were copied extensively throughout the United Kingdom in the council estates of the 1920s and 1930s.

Early life
Born in 1864, Russell had been articled to Henry Hewitt Bridgman 1881–84 and had studied at the Royal Academy Schools from 1882, thereafter becoming a draughtsman in the office of Thomas Chatfield Clarke, who designed the Royal Bank of Scotland building in Bishopsgate, London. He entered partnership with James Glen Sivewright Gibson in 1890. The partnership of Gibson and Russell was dissolved in 1899, Russell entering into partnership with Edwin Cooper.

Housing department of the Ministry of Health
Dr Addison appointed a number of architects to draw up designs for model plans for worker cottages (houses). This was the first time that workers cottages had the benefit of professional design. Russell drew up most of the cottage plans. He established "the cardinal principles  of good design as the proper dispositions of streets and buildings". The living room should benefit from the sunny aspect, the larder should be in a cool position and the coal store should be easily accessed from both within the building and from outside the house. The rear should be clear of projections that cut off both light and air, and the passageways, stairways and landings free from waste. Local authorities were free to draw up their own designs; but all were compared to those of Russell.

Buildings
He is credited with:
 Eastriggs Garden Village, Eastriggs, Dumfriesshire
 1890: London County Council Municipal Lodging House
 1892: St Pancras Municipal Buildings, St Pancras, London
 1896: North Bridge, Edinburgh
 1897: Town Hall, Cardiff
 1898: Bromley Hospital, Bromley, London
 1899: Cartwright Memorial Hall, Bradford
 1911–13: Brighton Hove & Sussex Sixth Form College (BHASVIC), Brighton, East Sussex
 1913: Dalziel High School, Motherwell
 1916: Garden Village, Gretna

References
Notes

Bibliography
 

Public housing in the United Kingdom
20th-century Scottish architects
1864 births
1955 deaths
19th-century Scottish architects